Ilya Aleksandrovich Borodin (born 6 July 1976) is a former Russian professional footballer.

Club career
He made his debut in the Russian Premier League in 1995 for FC Rotor Volgograd. He played 1 game in the UEFA Cup 1998–99 for FC Rotor Volgograd.

Honours
 Russian Premier League bronze: 1996.
 Russian Second Division Zone Povolzhye top scorer: 2001 (24 goals).

References

1976 births
Sportspeople from Volgograd
Living people
Russian footballers
FC Rotor Volgograd players
FC Energiya Volzhsky players
FC Dynamo Stavropol players
FC Tyumen players
Russian Premier League players
FC Volga Nizhny Novgorod players
FC Gornyak Uchaly players
FC Nizhny Novgorod (2007) players
FC Mordovia Saransk players

Association football forwards